Erison is a given name. It may refer to:

 Erison Carlos dos Santos Silva (born 1980), commonly known as Pingo, Brazilian footballer
 Erison da Silva Santos Carnietto (born 1981), commonly known as Baiano, Brazilian footballer
 Erison Danilo de Souza (born 1999), Brazilian footballer
 Erison Hurtault (born 1984), American sprinter